BOE Technology Group Co., Ltd., or Jingdongfang, is a Chinese electronic components producer founded in April 1993. Its core businesses are interface devices, smart IoT systems and smart medicine and engineering integration. BOE is one of the world's largest manufacturers of LCD, OLEDs and flexible displays.

History 
In April 1993, Beijing Oriental Electronics Group Co., Ltd was founded by Wang Dongsheng. In 1997, it listed B shares on the Shenzhen Stock Exchange. In 2001, Beijing Oriental Electronics was renamed BOE Technology Group Co., Ltd. BOE acquired SK Hynix's STN-LCD and OLED businesses for US$22.5 million. Issued additional A shares in Shenzhen Stock Exchange. In 2003, BOE acquired SK Hynix's Hydis flat-panel display businesses for US$380 million.

In 2009, BOE Energy Technology Co., Ltd was founded to enter the photovoltaics industry. In 2010, BOE acquired Suzhou Gaochuang Electronics' Taipei Display Research Center and AIO Manufacturing Plant. BOE also acquired  K-Tronics for an undisclosed amount.

In 2011, BOE established a Japan branch and R&D center in Tokyo. In 2012, BOE established an American branch and R&D center in Santa Clara in Silicon Valley, California. In 2014, BOE established a subsidiary in Frankfurt, Germany. In 2015, BOE acquired OASIS International Hospital.

In 2016, BOE acquired automotive displays maker Varitronix for RMB60.1 million. It set up a subsidiary in New Delhi, India.

In 2017, BOE established its Middle East Branch in Dubai and set up a subsidiary based in São Paulo, Brazil. BOE also announced its plan to build a hospital in Chengdu which will be opened in late 2020. BOE announced a long-term agreement with Universal Display Corporation, UDC will supply phosphorescent OLED materials to BOE. According to IHS Markit, BOE became shipped the most displays larger-than-9-inch for tablets, notebook PCs and monitors. However LG Display still lead in terms of area shipment.

In 2018, BOE acquired SES-imagotag for €200 million. BOE formed a joint venture with Kopin Corporation and Olightek for OLED micro-displays manufacturing. BOE established subsidiares in Jakarta, Indonesia and Johannesburg, South Africa. According to Sigmaintell Consulting, BOE overtook LG Display as the world's largest LCD TV and monitor producer with 54.3 million TV panels and 37.3 million monitor panels shipped. The Huawei Mate 20 Pro is the first flagship tier smartphone with an AMOLED sourced from BOE (also sourced from LG Display).

In 2019, BOE formed a joint venture with Rohinni for MicroLED and mini LED backlighting manufacturing. Hisense announced its U9E TVs featuring dual LCD panels which Hisense said exceeds OLED TVs in brightness, color gamut and color accuracy. Its panels are produced by BOE. The Huawei Mate X scheduled for release in Q4 2019 reportly has a foldable OLED from BOE. According to IHS Markets, BOE had the second highest marketshare of the smartphone OLED panel market at 5.9%, only behind Samsung Displays. BOE will also surpass LG Display as the world's largest flat-panel display producer. And BOE has partnered with Huawei to research cameras under OLEDs. BOE is reportedly in talks to replace LG Display and Tianma as OLED supplier for LG Electronics smartphones in 2020. BOE also became an OLED supplier for Apple beginning in 2021 for the iPhone.

On February 1, 2022, the company announced they had developed the world’s fastest gaming monitor with a 500Hz refresh rate. The prototype 27-inch monitor has a resolution of 1080p. In 2023, the company was reportedly predicted to become the largest supplier of OLED display panels for the Apple iPhone 15 series according to Ming-Chi Kuo, a Taiwanese Apple analyst at TF International Security.

Competitive position
In 2021, WIPO’s annual World Intellectual Property Indicators report ranked BOE Technology's number of patent applications published under the PCT System as 7th in the world, with 1,892 patent applications being published during 2020. This position is down from their previous ranking as 6th in 2019 with 1,864 applications.

Operations 
BOE has manufacturing facilities located in Beijing, Hefei, Chengdu, Chongqing, Fuzhou, Mianyang, Wuhan, Kunming, Suzhou, Ordos and Gu'an. BOE has global marketing and R&D centers in 19 countries, such as Japan, South Korea, Singapore, the United States, Germany, the United Kingdom, France, Switzerland, India, Russia, Brazil and Dubai.

References

External links 
 

Computer hardware companies
Electronics companies of China
Multinational companies headquartered in China
Manufacturing companies based in Beijing
Electronics companies established in 1993
Manufacturing companies established in 1993
Chinese companies established in 1993
Chinese brands
Government-owned companies of China